Marie Sýkorová (18 November 1952 – March 2018) was a Czech field hockey player who competed in the 1980 Summer Olympics. She was born in České Budějovice.

References

External links
 

1952 births
2018 deaths
Czech female field hockey players
Olympic field hockey players of Czechoslovakia
Field hockey players at the 1980 Summer Olympics
Olympic silver medalists for Czechoslovakia
Olympic medalists in field hockey
Sportspeople from České Budějovice
Medalists at the 1980 Summer Olympics